The 2022 Florida's 20th congressional district special election was a special election to the United States House of Representatives. The seat had been vacant since incumbent Democratic representative Alcee Hastings died on April 6, 2021, of pancreatic cancer.

The special election was scheduled by Governor Ron DeSantis to be held on January 11, 2022. The primary elections were held on November 2, 2021.

Democratic primary

Campaign
Following Hastings' death, 11 Democratic candidates made the primary ballot to replace him.

Candidates

Nominee
 Sheila Cherfilus-McCormick, healthcare executive and candidate for this district in 2018 and 2020

Eliminated in primary
 Elvin Dowling, author
 Bobby DuBose, minority leader of the Florida House of Representatives
 Omari Hardy, state representative
 Dale Holness, Broward County commissioner and former mayor of Broward County
 Phil Jackson, retired U.S. Navy officer
 Emmanuel Morel, former federal labor investigator, candidate for Florida's 21st congressional district in 2014, and candidate for this district in 2020
 Barbara Sharief, Broward County commissioner and former mayor of Broward County
 Imran Uddin Siddiqui, internist
 Priscilla Taylor, former state representative and candidate for mayor of West Palm Beach in 2019
 Perry E. Thurston Jr., state senator

Disqualified
 Natalia Allen, author
 Matt Boswell, businessman
 Krystal Jordan, counselor
 Marlon Onias, attorney
 Pradel Vilme, former Miami International Airport official

Declined
 Mack Bernard, Palm Beach County Commissioner
 Shevrin Jones, state senator
 Melissa McKinlay, Palm Beach County Commissioner and former mayor of Palm Beach County (endorsed Barbara Sharief)
 Bobby Powell, state senator (endorsed DuBose)
 Chris Smith, former state senator

Debates

Endorsements

Polling
Graphical summary

Results
Per Florida law, because the margin separating Cherfilus-McCormick and Holness was less than 0.5%, a recount was held. Ballots received by November 12 from overseas were accepted. The two candidates were two votes apart as some ballots that had been cast were still in dispute. On November 12, over a week after the primary, the Broward County canvassing board declared Cherfilus-McCormick the winner after a recount failed to change the vote totals. However, Holness did not immediately concede, pointing out that the board had rejected twelve overseas military ballots. He said he would confer with a lawyer to decide whether or not to challenge the results. The Palm Beach County canvassing board voted to certify the election results on the same day. State officials certified the results on November 16.

Cherfilus-McCormick won in Palm Beach County, receiving 30% of the vote. Meanwhile, Holness won in Broward County, where he serves as county commissioner, with 29% of the vote.

Aftermath
Holness filed a lawsuit in Broward County Circuit Court on November 29 asking it to overturn the election results, alleging Cherfilus-McCormick to be "ineligible to hold office." The lawsuit asserts that Cherfilus-McCormick did not file proper financial paperwork and that her support for a universal basic income of $1,000 per month amounted to bribing voters. Holness claimed that voters had asked workers at polling places "where they collect the $1,000 from, so they expected to get $1,000." Election lawyer and former state representative Juan-Carlos Planas described the lawsuit as a "Hail Mary pass" and doubted it would be successful. Don James, an attorney for Holness, acknowledged that the challenge likely would not be resolved in time for the election. Mail-in ballots for the special election with Cherfilus-McCormick listed as the Democratic nominee were sent out beginning on December 3.

On December 6, Cherfilus-McCormick's attorneys filed a lengthy brief in response to the lawsuit that disputed its claims, calling it "a desperate attempt to overturn the will of the voters." In response to the allegation of bribery, the brief points out that promising monetary benefits to voters is common, comparing Cherfilus-McCormick's support for a universal basic income to "a chicken in every pot and a car in every garage," a slogan used by former president Herbert Hoover in his 1928 presidential campaign. The brief also claims that Holness's complaint was filed too late and is thus invalid, and asks the judge to dismiss it and order Holness to pay Cherfilus-McCormick's legal fees. Ultimately, Holness's challenge fell flat, as no judge took up the case.

Republican primary

Campaign
Two Republicans made the primary ballot, businessman Jason Mariner and Greg Musselwhite, who had been the Republican nominee for the seat in 2020. The two men cut different appearances on the campaign trail, with Mariner presenting himself in a clean-cut fashion while Musselwhite campaigned in a more folksy manner. A substantial part of Mariner's campaign was based around his turning his life around after previously being imprisoned twice on various felony charges. Musselwhite attacked Mariner for his prior felony convictions, claiming in a later-deleted Facebook post that voters had a choice between "the correctional officer or the inmate".

Mariner ran as an "America First conservative", promoting false claims that the results of the 2020 presidential election were illegitimate, as well as making statements in support of the rioters at the 2021 U.S. Capitol attack and the Confederate Flag, which he defended as a "battle flag that was later co-opted by racist groups".

Candidates

Nominee
 Jason Mariner, businessman

Eliminated in primary
 Gregory "Greg" Musselwhite, welding inspector and nominee for this district in 2020

Disqualified
 Vic DeGrammont, realtor
 Roland Florez
 Lateresa Jones, perennial candidate
 Bernard Sansaricq, former president of the Haiti Senate

Endorsements

Results

Independent and third-party candidates

Libertarian Party

Declared
 Mike ter Maat, economist and Hallandale Beach police officer

Independents

Declared 
 Jim Flynn, real estate broker
 Leonard Serratore, Palm Beach International Airport official

Disqualified 
 Robert Ornelas, perennial candidate

General election

Predictions

Endorsements
Endorsements in bold were made after the primary elections.

Results
As expected by election prognosticators, Cherfilus-McCormick won the election by a landslide, winning 79% of the popular vote. In spite of this, Mariner refused to concede, threatening to file a lawsuit to dispute the results.

See also
 2022 United States House of Representatives elections
 2022 United States elections
 117th United States Congress
 List of special elections to the United States House of Representatives

Notes

Partisan clients

References

External links
Official campaign websites
 Sheila Cherfilus-McCormick (D) for Congress
 Jason Mariner (R) for Congress
 Mike ter Maat (L) for Congress

Florida 2022 20
Florida 2022 20
2022 20 Special
Florida 20 Special
United States House of Representatives 20 Special
United States House of Representatives 2022 20